Typha orientalis, commonly known as bulrush, cumbungi, or raupō, is a perennial herbaceous plant in the genus Typha. It is native to Australia, New Zealand, Malaysia, Indonesia, Japan, Korea, Mongolia, Myanmar, Philippines, China and the Russian Far East (Sakhalin and Primorye).

T. orientalis is a wetland plant that grows on the edges of ponds, lakes, salt marshes, and slow flowing rivers and streams.

Use
Known as raupō in New Zealand, the plant was quite useful to Māori. The rhizomes were cooked and eaten, while the flowers were baked into cakes. The leaves were used for roofs and walls and occasionally for canoe sails, as well as a material for making kites. Māori introduced the plant to the Chatham Islands.

References

orientalis
Inflorescence vegetables
Root vegetables
Flora of Asia
Flora of Malesia
Flora of Australia
Flora of China
Flora of Korea
Flora of Mongolia
Flora of Myanmar
Flora of New Zealand
Flora of Russia
Flora of the Kermadec Islands
Taxa named by Carl Borivoj Presl
Plants described in 1851